Independence Historic District in Independence, Oregon, United States is a historic district that was listed on the National Register of Historic Places (NRHP) in 1989. The roughly 30-block district preserves approximately 250 homes and businesses of a prosperous riverside town of the 1880s.

History
Main Street, running along the Willamette River, is notable as an example of a late-nineteenth/early-twentieth century main street and features two commercial buildings with prominent Victorian-era towers. Most of the buildings on Main Street were built of brick between 1880 and 1900.

Independence thrived as a shipping point, by both rail and boat, for agricultural products and lumber until the 1950s. The city was known for its hops production from the 1890s through the 1940s, dubbing itself the "Hop Capital of the World." When the demand for hops dropped, the city's fortunes began to decline. One reason Independence is so well-preserved today is that it was bypassed by major freeways in the 1960s, so there wasn't a push to modernize the downtown. Today the historic district is being revitalized as a tourism destination.

Individual listings within the district
The district includes five buildings separately listed on the NRHP:
Dr. John E. and Mary D. Davidson House (c. 1878)
Independence National Bank (1891) designed by architect Walter D. Pugh
Kersey C. Eldridge House (1914)
J. A. Wheeler House (c.1880)
Saint Patrick's Roman Catholic Church (c. 1874)

See also 
 Alcohol in Oregon
 Oregon breweries

References

External links

Images of historic architecture in Independence from the University of Oregon Library digital architecture collection
Independence Historic District listing in the Oregon Historic Sites Database of Oregon Parks and Recreation Department
Historic images of Main Street in Independence from Salem Public Library
2009 Statesman-Journal article about the J. S. Cooper House

National Register of Historic Places in Polk County, Oregon
Historic districts on the National Register of Historic Places in Oregon
Geography of Polk County, Oregon
Independence, Oregon
1989 establishments in Oregon